AfriMobile was a mobile virtual network operator based in the United Kingdom. It was established in 2012 and was dissolved in October 2020. It specialised in providing low cost international calls to African countries and services such as airtime credit transfer, with its main user base being African communities within the UK.

References

Mobile virtual network operators
Mobile phone companies of the United Kingdom
Companies disestablished in 2020